Irina-Camelia Begu and Elena Bogdan were the defending champions, but both chose not to participate.

Karin Knapp and Mandy Minella won the tournament, defeating Alexandra Cadanțu and Raluca Olaru in the final, 6–4, 6–3.

Seeds

Draw

References 
 Draw

Copa Bionaire - Doubles
Copa Bionaire